Count Viktor Nikitich Panin (9 April (28 March Old Style) 1801 Moscow – 13 April (1 April Old Style) 1862 Nice) was conservative Russian Minister of Justice (1841–1862). He was the younger son of Count Nikita Petrovich Panin by Countess Sofia Vladimirovna Orlova.

His granddaughter, Sofia Panina was a philanthropist who became active in the Constitutional Democratic Party following the February Revolution. She was subjected to a political trial following the Bolshevik seizure of power in the October Revolution.

External links
 https://web.archive.org/web/20050430073212/http://hp.iitp.ru/eng/42/4258.htm

1801 births
1862 deaths
Politicians of the Russian Empire
Justice ministers of Russia
Members of the State Council (Russian Empire)